There have been 113 modern Summer Olympic athletes, who made their Olympic debut up to and including 2000, who have identified as lesbian, gay, bisexual, transgender, pansexual, non-binary, queer, or who have openly been in a same-sex relationship, including one who has also competed at the Winter Olympic Games. The first Olympic Games in which an athlete now known to be LGBT+ competed was the 1900 Summer Olympics, also the first LGBT+ Olympic medalist and first contemporaneously out Olympian.

The most decorated able-bodied LGBT+ Summer Olympian is Australian swimmer Ian Thorpe, with 9 medals including 5 golds. At least 64 LGBT+ Summer Olympians to 2000 are medalists (56.64%), of which 33 have at least one gold medal (29.2%).

Overview

Key 

Tables are default sorted by first Games appearance chronologically, then current surname or common nickname alphabetically, then first name alphabetically. They can be sorted by current surname (where used) or common nickname alphabetically; by country and sport alphabetically; by Games chronologically; and by medals as organised in Olympics medals tables.

Summer Olympic athletes (1900–2000)

Notes

References

Sources

Databases
International Olympic Committee

Olympedia

Australian Olympic Committee

databaseOlympics

German Football Association

World Triathlon

Literature

Print media

Web media

Summer Olympians 1900
LGBT Summer 1900